The following is an incomplete list of association football clubs based in Togo.
For a complete list see :Category:Football clubs in Togo

A
Abou Ossé FC
AC Merlan
AC Semassi F.C.
Anges de Notsè
AS Douanes (Lomé)
AS Togo-Port
ASKO Kara

D
Doumbé FC
Dynamic Togolais

E
Espoir Tsevie
Étoile Filante (Lomé)

F
Foadam Dapaong
Foadan FC

G
Gbikinti FC de Bassar
Gomido FC

K
Kakadlé FC
Korikossa Atakpame
Kotoko FC

M
Maranatha FC

O
OC Agaza

R
RC Lomé

S
Sara Sport de Bafilo

T
Tchaoudjo AC
Togo Telecom FC

U
Unisport de Sokodé
US Kokori
US Masséda

 
Togo
Football
Football clubs